Calgary Midnapore is a federal electoral district in Alberta, Canada, that has been represented in the House of Commons of Canada since 2015. It has been represented by Stephanie Kusie since she won the 2017 by-election.

Calgary Midnapore was created by the 2012 federal electoral boundaries redistribution and was legally defined in the 2013 representation order. It came into effect upon the call of the 42nd Canadian federal election, which was held in October 2015. It was created mostly out of the former seat of Calgary Southeast, with smaller portions coming from Calgary Southwest and Macleod. It is named for the Midnapore neighbourhood.

While Calgary has long tilted rightward, Calgary Midnapore is located in a particularly conservative area of Calgary. Counting its time as Calgary Southeast, it has always been held by a member of the major right-wing party of the day, often by large margins. After neighbouring Calgary Heritage (the former Calgary Southwest), it is the second-safest Conservative riding in Calgary.

Boundaries
Consisting of that part of the City of Calgary described as follows: commencing at the intersection of Macleod Trail S with Glenmore Trail SE (Highway No. 8); thence generally easterly along Glenmore Trail SE (Highway No. 8) to the left bank of the Bow River; thence generally southerly along said bank, including all islands adjacent to the river bank, to the southerly limit of said city; thence southerly, westerly and generally northwesterly along the southerly and westerly limits of said city to Spruce Meadows Way SW; thence northerly along said way and northerly and easterly along James McKevitt Road SW to Macleod Trail S; thence generally northerly along said trail to the point of commencement.

Population
In 2013, a total of 111,227 persons lived in the riding's boundaries. Of these, 86,000 spoke English as their "mother tongue" and 1,650 claimed French as their native language. Of the more than 20,000 who spoke English as a second language, or not at all, the next largest group was the over 2,600 who spoke Tagalog (Filipino). The number of residents who spoke English as their first official Canadian language was 107,320, and 1,580 spoke French as their primary official language.

Members of Parliament
This riding has elected the following members of the House of Commons of Canada:

Election results

References

Alberta federal electoral districts
Politics of Calgary